Wiednitz (Sorbian: Wětnica) is a village and former municipality in the district of Bautzen, in Saxony, Germany. With effect from 1 January 2012, it has been incorporated into the town of Bernsdorf.

References 

Former municipalities in Saxony
Populated places in Bautzen (district)
Bernsdorf, Upper Lusatia